Blanca Lake is located in the Henry M. Jackson Wilderness Area in the Cascade Mountains of the U.S. state of Washington.

Blanca Lake sits in a basin surrounded by the peaks of Monte Cristo, Kyes, and Columbia. The lake is fed by the Columbia Glacier to the northwest and is drained by Troublesome Creek, a tributary of the North Fork Skykomish River. The glacier's cold, silt-filled melt water is what makes the lake a spectacular turquoise green color making this a prime example of a rock flour lake.

Blanca Lake is accessible only by foot, along the Blanca Lake Trail. Due to its elevation, and the heavy snowpack of the Pacific Northwest, Blanca Lake is typically only easily accessible from June until the snows of October or November.

Its beauty makes it a very popular destination for hikers, despite the difficult climb up the mountain trail.

To get to the trailhead, take US Forest Road 65/Beckler Road  near Skykomish, WA to the intersection with US Forest Road 63. Northwest Forest Pass is still required to park and a US Forest Service Daily Fee of $5 per vehicle.

Notes

External links
 US Forest Service

Lakes of Washington (state)
Lakes of Snohomish County, Washington
Mount Baker-Snoqualmie National Forest